This list of PSG College of Technology people is a selected list of notable past staff and students of the PSG College of Technology.

Academics

G. V. Loganathan, former professor, Virginia Tech
A. G. Ramakrishnan, professor, Indian Institute of Science
Siva Umapathy, Shanti Swarup Bhatnagar laureate
Kalidhindi B. R. Varma, Vice-chancellor, Sri Sathya Sai Institute of Higher Learning
Madhu Bhaskaran, engineer and Professor at RMIT University
Navin Ramankutty, Professor of Global Food Security and Sustainability at the University of British Columbia

Business

Shiv Nadar, chairman and CSO of HCL Technologies
C Vijayakumar, CEO, HCL Technologies
Sundar Raman, CEO of Reliance Sports and Cricket Administrator
Sundaram Karivardhan, industrialist and motorsport pioneer
Lakshmi Narayanan, ex-vice chairman and ex-CEO of Cognizant and Chairman of ICT Academy
Madhusudhan Rao Lagadapati, executive chairman of Lanco Infratech

Government, Politics and Public Services

Y. S. Chowdary, former Minister of State, Science and Technology & Earth Sciences, Government of India
Jose K. Mani, Member of Parliament in the Rajya Sabha
K. Pandiarajan, businessman and politician
Ramachandran Govindarasu, former secretary of ADMK (IT Wing)
 K. Annamalai, Former IPS & Current Vice President of Tamil Nadu BJP

Arts and Entertainment

Cottalango Leon, winner of Academy Award
Mahesh Muthuswami, cinematographer
Gopal Menon, documentary filmmaker
Aparna B Marar, classical dancer

Scientists

Mylswamy Annadurai, director of Chandrayaan-1 and Chandrayaan-2, ISRO
R. M. Vasagam, space scientist and former Project Director, Ariane Passenger Payload Experiment

References

External links
 

Lists of people by university or college in India